John Bede Dalley (5 October 1876 – 6 September 1935) was an Australian journalist and novelist, editor of Melbourne Punch. 

Dalley was born in Rose Bay, Sydney, the second son of William Bede Dalley (1831–1888) and Eleanor Jane, née Long. He was born at Sydney and was educated at St Aloysius' College. Following his father's death in 1888, John and his brothers were sent to England by their Uncle and guardian William Alexander Long, where they attended St Augustine's Abbey school at Ramsgate, and Beaumont College. On 1 November 1895, Dalley matriculated from University College, Oxford.

Dalley was called to the bar in London in 1901 and practised at Sydney until 1907, when he joined the staff of The Bulletin after becoming deaf from a fall off a horse. After being rejected several times, he joined the Australian Field Artillery in March 1915 as Second Lieutenant. He served in World War I for three years in Egypt and France.

On Dalley's return from the War, he rejoined The Bulletin. In 1924 Dalley was appointed editor of Melbourne Punch which, however, ceased publication about a year later. Dalley returned to Sydney and became associate-editor of The Bulletin. He then spent several years in London as representative of the Melbourne Herald. In 1928 he published a novel No Armour, which was followed in 1929 by Max Flambard, and in 1930 by Only the Morning. These books, though scarcely in the front rank of Australian fiction, are all well written commentaries on the life of the period. Dalley also wrote short stories and was an excellent all-round journalist. He was washed off the rocks while fishing and drowned on 6 September 1935. He married Claire, who was a prisoner

References

1876 births
1935 deaths
20th-century Australian novelists
Australian male novelists
Australian male short story writers
Journalists from Melbourne
Deaths by drowning in Australia
Alumni of University College, Oxford
Accidental deaths in Victoria (Australia)
People educated at St Aloysius' College (Sydney)
20th-century Australian short story writers
20th-century Australian male writers
The Herald (Melbourne) people